Cathedral Hill is a neighborhood and a hill, in the Western Addition district of San Francisco, California.

Location
The neighbourhood's northern border is Post Street, the eastern border is Van Ness Avenue, the southern border is Eddy Street and the western border is Laguna Street.

Attractions and characteristics
The neighborhood is centered on St. Mary's Cathedral on the corner of Geary Street and Gough Street.

It is home to large condominium and apartment towers, plus numerous churches built atop the hill, including St. Mary's Cathedral, St. Mark's Lutheran Church, The First Unitarian Church of San Francisco, and the Hamilton Baptist Church.

The neighborhood's former Cathedral Hill Hotel at Van Ness and Geary Streets was torn down and replaced by a new earthquake-proof California Pacific Medical Center hospital between 2013 and 2021.

The Sacred Heart Cathedral Prep school is in the neighborhood.

See also

List of San Francisco, California Hills
Neighborhoods of San Francisco

References

External links
 Cathedral Hill Neighbors Association
 Cathedral Hill Neighbors Association on Yahoo Groups

 Neighborhoods in San Francisco
 Hills of San Francisco
 Western Addition, San Francisco